Nilanka Premaratne (born Weda Gedara Heeran Nilanka Premaratne on 17 June 1988) is a Sri Lankan cricketer. He is a right-handed batsman and left-arm medium-fast bowler who plays for Ragama Cricket Club. He was born in Kandy and educated in Bandaranayake College.

Premaratne made his cricketing debut for Ragama Cricket Club Under-23s during the 2008 season, and played for the side in the one-day and two-day games in 2008 and 2009.

Premaratne made his first-class debut during the 2009–10 season, against Chilaw Marians. In the first innings in which he bowled, he took figures of 5-58.

References

External links
Nilanka Premaratne at Cricinfo

1988 births
Living people
Sri Lankan cricketers
Ragama Cricket Club cricketers
Cricketers from Kandy
Sri Lanka Cricket Combined XI cricketers
Alumni of Bandaranayake College, Gampaha